Adventure Parc Snowdonia, formerly Surf Snowdonia is an adventure park and tourist attraction, incorporating an artificial wave pool, at Dolgarrog in the picturesque Conwy valley, north Wales, owned by Conwy Adventure Leisure Ltd. It is the world's first commercial artificial surfing lake.
 The site cost a total of £12 million and opened in August 2015.

History

  In 2007 Dolgarrog Aluminium closed, and the following year the site was purchased by Ainscough Johnston, a Lancashire-based strategic land company, whose initial plans were for housing – including affordable housing – and for leisure and amenity uses. 

Plans for a surfing attraction were unveiled in 2013, with Conwy Adventure Leisure announcing that it was submitting a planning application for the venue. The company predicted the facility would "attract 67–70,000 visitors [a year]". Conwy Adventure Leisure received planning permission in August 2013 and in December said it had invested over £7 million in the project. The park gained final approval from councillors in April 2014, with construction beginning in May. In June the project received £4 million in funding from the Welsh Government.
Much initial decontamination work had to be undertaken, following a century of use as an industrial site, and over 25,000 cubic metres of on-site material was crushed and re-used during the construction, including the recycling of 400 tonnes of steel, cast iron and copper.

Development of the site was also complicated by the fact that it is adjacent to a Site of Special Scientific Interest, there is a high water table, and it is located on the flood plain of the River Conwy. A total of 6.3 miles of piling was driven into the ground in order to stabilize it.

In April 2015 a fire broke out on the construction site, causing some damage to a tower. The site opened to the public on 1 August 2015, having cost a total of £12 million. It served 14,000 people in its first two weeks of operation, including 3,500 people who surfed in the pool.

Pool
Surf Snowdonia has a freshwater pool which contains a wave-generation mechanism, manufactured by the Leitner Group, and based on a prototype built in San Sebastián, Spain, by the Spanish company Wavegarden. It has a contoured base that can generate three different sized waves, at a rate of one a minute. The company claims this is the longest man-made surf wave in the world. The pool is filled with rainwater collected from Snowdonia reservoirs including Llyn Cowlyd. This water passes through the adjacent hydro-power station, originally built to power the former aluminium plant, before being pumped from the tail-race into the surfing pool.

A bi-directional snowplough-shaped wave-generation mechanism, towed on a cable between the two central towers, moves up and down the pool on a three-rail track, generating the waves. The underwater machinery, powered by a 2MW motor, is covered with a protective stainless steel netted screen, to keep surfers from any moving parts, yet without impairing the energy of the waves.
The water in the pool is cleaned and cycled every 24 hours by passing through ultraviolet cleaners, so that the water can be chlorine-free.

The wave pool can be used by as many as 52 surfers at one time.

Other attractions
As well as the wave pool, since the park expanded to become Adventure Parc Snowdonia it offers indoor attractions such as an assault course, high ropes, soft play, and caving, and outdoor attractions including a zip line, climbing wall, and bike hire.

Staff and facilities
The Managing Director  during its constructions and initial opening phase was Steve Davies MBE,   previously   Director of the National Railway Museum in York .  

The facility currently employs some 109 people. with an additional 48 for the restaurant and bar  .

Other facilities on site include a surfing academy, Adrenaline indoors, a zip wire over the lagoon, a café bar and coffee shop, a play shack for children, a retail area, and 36 wooden camping pods.  Additional accommodation is available at a Hilton Garden Inn.

Reception
In the first week, the centre received up to 1,000 visitors a day.
In its first season, prior to winter closure in 2015, the surf lagoon was booked at an average of 97% occupancy.  

Reaction to the facility from professional surfers has been favourable

Events
On 18-19 September 2015, Surf Snowdonia hosted Red Bull Unleashed, the world's first stadium surf contest, with 24 surfers from around the world. The event, watched by 2,000 spectators on the final day, was won by Hawaiian surfer Albee Layer.

On 24 October 2016 Surf Snowdonia hosted the first Surf Snowdonia Pro UK Surf Challenge, when the UK's top male, female and junior surfers competed in a knock-out competition.

The UK Pro Surf Tour returned to Surf Snowdonia on 22 October 2017.

See also
The Wave: Bristol

References

External links

WaveGarden website
First artificial wave competition at Red Bull Unleashed
Animal.co.uk - Red Bull Unleashed: A Breakdown

Dolgarrog
Tourist attractions in Conwy County Borough
Water parks in the United Kingdom
Surfing locations in Wales